Leomar Francisco Rodrigues (born 12 June 1987), or simply Leomar, is an association footballer who plays as a defender for Caxias Futebol Clube.

Club career
In August 2009, Leomar moved on loan to Uzbek League side FC Bunyodkor, linking up with fellow Brazilians João Victor, Ratinho and Rivaldo.

In August 2012, Leomar was loaned by Naval 1º de Maio to Penafiel for the 2012–13 season.

In 2013, he transferred to Botafogo SP. In 2014, he played for Arapongas.

Honours
Bunyodkor
Uzbek League (1): 2009
Fortaleza
Campeonato Cearense (1): 2010

References

External links

1986 births
Living people
Brazilian footballers
Brazilian expatriate footballers
Expatriate footballers in Uzbekistan
Expatriate footballers in Portugal
Uzbekistan Super League players
Liga Portugal 2 players
Mogi Mirim Esporte Clube players
Paulista Futebol Clube players
Red Bull Brasil players
FC Bunyodkor players
Fortaleza Esporte Clube players
Associação Naval 1º de Maio players
F.C. Penafiel players
Botafogo Futebol Clube (SP) players
Associação Desportiva Recreativa e Cultural Icasa players
Esporte Clube Democrata players
Sociedade Esportiva e Recreativa Caxias do Sul players
Association football defenders
Sportspeople from Campinas